Earthshaker may refer to:

Poseidon, a god in Greek mythology.

In music:
 Earthshaker (album), an album by Y&T
The Earthshaker, an album by Koko Taylor
 Earthshaker (band), a Japanese metal band

In games:
 Earthshaker!, an accessory for the Dungeons & Dragons role-playing game
 Earthshaker! (pinball), a pinball machine